Chibuike Benjamin Nnonah (born September 22, 1994), born in Enugu State, better known as Benjamz, is a Nigerian record producer  who has worked with a vast array of artists and musicians including Phyno, Burna Boy, Dremo, Tekno, Illbliss and Yung6ix. He was born and raised in Enugu. Benjamz is credited with the production of six tracks from Phyno's The Playmaker album. He is most notable for co-producing African Giant by Burna Boy with Kel-P. The Grammy Award nominated song earned him a special recognition from the recording academy. He also single handedly produced "Gum Body" featuring Jorja Smith from the same album and "Stfu" from Codename Vol. 2 by Dremo.

Early life
Benjamz is a native of Agbani in Nkanu West Enugu State.  He is a graduate of industrial physics from the Enugu State University of Science and Technology.

Career
His breakthrough as a record producer came in 2016, when he produced the track "Pino Pino" by Phyno off his The Playmaker album. In 2017, he was nominated in the "New" Discovery Producer category at the 2017 edition of The Beatz Awards.  Benjamz has gone on to produce and be credited in popular songs and albums including The Playmaker' by Phyno, African Giant by Burna Boy, Old Romance by Tekno, Codename Vol. 2 by Dremo and Deal with it by Phyno. 
He was given a special recognition by the Grammy academy for his work on African Giant by Burna Boy

Production credits
 African Giant  - Burna Boy (Co-Produced with Kel-P) 
 Gum Body ft Jorja Smith - Burna Boy 
 Pino Pino - Phyno 
 Deal With It - Phyno 
 I'm a fan - Phyno Mistakes - Phyno Deri - Phyno Iyilu Ife - Phyno Bigger Meat - Dremo
 Chairman - Dremo Breezy - Dremo Faya - Dremo Stfu - Dremo Nobody - Dremo''
 Armageddon - Tekno (musician)
 Forty Feet container ft Olamide - Illbliss
 Wake up - Yung6ix

Album credits

Awards and nominations

References

1994 births
Living people
Nigerian hip hop record producers
21st-century Nigerian musicians
People from Enugu State
Igbo musicians